Gösta Pettersson is an emeritus professor in biochemistry at Lund University, Sweden. He was born in 1937 in Varberg, Sweden. He gained his Ph.D. in 1966 based on a thesis about natural products. He developed methods in enzyme kinetics based on mathematical modelling and proper statistical analysis, especially for the enzyme alcohol dehydrogenase. He has written a text book on enzyme kinetics. He also made contributions in control theory of biochemical reaction networks, a predecessor to systems biology. After retirement, he has been engaged in the question of global warming and has published a critical book against alarmists, in which the greenhouse effect is critically discussed from a scientific and kinetic perspective.

References

Swedish biochemists
People connected to Lund University
1937 births
Living people